Chroscin may refer to:
Chrościn, Masovian Voivodeship, Poland
Chróścin, Łódź Voivodeship, Poland